The George Gershwin Theatre is a 500-seat proscenium theatre, one of four situated in the Brooklyn Center for the Performing Arts complex located on the campus of Brooklyn College at 2900 Campus Road in Brooklyn, New York, United States.

Named after the prolific Brooklyn-born composer, it opened its doors in 1953. It is used for four annual productions staged by the college's theatre department, whose alumni include Jimmy Smits, Paul Mazursky, and Joel Zwick, as well as music concerts, recitals, and film screenings, many of which are offered free to the community.

In 1993, President Bill Clinton unveiled his AmeriCorps initiative at the theater.

External links
 Brooklyn Center for the Performing Arts

Theatres in Brooklyn
Midwood, Brooklyn
Brooklyn College